Energy analyser or energy analyzer may refer to:

 A type of diagnostic probe used in the study of plasma physics
 An electron energy analyzer, as used in Auger Electron Spectroscopy
 Electrostatic analyzer, a device used in mass spectroscopy to allow the passage ions or electrons that have a given specific energy
 Wattmeter, an instrument which measures the electrical power circulating in any electric circuit

See also
 Power meter (disambiguation)